John Smithies may refer to:

 John Smithies (1802–1872), Wesleyan missionary
 John J. Smithies (born 1954), founding director of the Australian Centre for the Moving Image

See also
 Smithies (disambiguation)